Amistades Peligrosas ("Dangerous Friendships") is a Spanish band formed in 1989 by singers Alberto Comesaña from Galicia and Cristina del Valle from Asturias. Their music blended two Spanish Music types such as Celtic and Classical music. Bagpipes, flute and bouzouki are common instruments used by the band.

Discography
 Relatos de una intriga (1991) EMI
 La última tentación (1993) EMI
 La profecía (1995) EMI
 Nueva era (1997) EMI
 La larga espera (2003) Valemusic (+50.000 copies) gold in Spain
 El arte de amar (2013) Avispa Music
 Pacto de sal (2019)
 El regreso (2020)

 "Génesis" song

References

External links
Official website
Yahoo! Music biography

Spanish musical groups